Sikkim Prajatantra Congress (Sikkim Democratic Congress) is a political party in the Indian state of Sikkim.  Pawan Chamling, the current leader of Sikkim Democratic Front and Sikkim Chief Minister, was the treasurer of SPC 1978–1984. In the state assembly elections 1979 SPC had launched candidates in all 32 constituencies, and won four seats. The party got 11,400 votes (15,76%).

In the state assembly elections 1985 SPC had launched 14 candidates, whom together only mustered 438 votes. By that time Chamling had crossed over to Sikkim Sangram Parishad.

Electoral records 
 Sikkim Legislative Assembly election

 Lok Sabha election, Sikkim

References

Political parties in Sikkim
Political parties with year of establishment missing